Gloria may refer to:

Arts and entertainment

Music

Christian liturgy and music 
 Gloria in excelsis Deo, the Greater Doxology, a hymn of praise
 Gloria Patri, the Lesser Doxology, a short hymn of praise
 Gloria (Handel)
 Gloria (Jenkins)
 Gloria (Poulenc), a 1959 composition by Francis Poulenc
 Gloria (Vivaldi), a musical setting of the doxology by Antonio Vivaldi

Groups and labels 
 Gloria (Brazilian band), a post-hardcore/metalcore band
 Gloria, later named Unit Gloria, a Dutch band with Robert Long as member

Albums 
 Gloria (Disillusion album)
 Gloria!, an album by Gloria Estefan
 Gloria (Gloria Trevi album)
 Gloria (Okean Elzy album)
 Gloria (Sam Smith album)
 Gloria (Shadows of Knight album) (1966)
 Gloria (EP), an EP by Hawk Nelson

Songs 
 "Gloria" (Enchantment song) (1976), a song later covered by Jesse Powell in 1996
 "Gloria" (Mando Diao song), a 2009 song by Mando Diao from Give Me Fire
 "Gloria" (Leon René song), a song released by The Cadillacs in 1954
 "Gloria" (Them song), a song written by Van Morrison in 1964 and covered by artists including the Shadows of Knight and Patti Smith
 "Gloria" (Umberto Tozzi song) (1979), a song later covered by Laura Branigan in 1982
 "Gloria" (U2 song) (1981)
 "Gloria" (Yui song)
 "Gloria", a 1997 song by Mineral
 "Gloria", a 2013 song by Relient K from the album Collapsible Lung
 "Gloria", a 2014 song by The Midnight
 "Gloria", a 2019 song by the Lumineers

Films 
 Gloria (1977 film), a French film directed by Claude Autant-Lara
 Gloria (1980 film) (1980), a film by John Cassavetes
 Gloria (1999 American film), a remake by Sidney Lumet
 Gloria (1999 Portuguese film), a film by Manuela Viegas
 Gloria (2013 film), a Chilean film
 Gloria (2014 film), a Mexican film

Stage 
 Gloria (ballet), a ballet by Kenneth MacMillan
 Gloria (opera), an opera by Francesco Cilea
 Gloria (play), a play by Branden Jacobs-Jenkins

Television
 Gloria (South Korean TV series), a South Korean MBC television series
 Gloria (American TV series), an All in the Family spin-off
 Glória (2021 TV series), a Portuguese Netflix historical thriller drama television series

People and fictional characters 
 Gloria (given name), including a list of people and fictional characters
 Gloria (Bulgarian singer), Bulgarian pop/folk singer
 Gloria (Irish singer), best known for her version of "One Day at a Time"

Places 
 Gloria, Lafayette Parish, Louisiana, an unincorporated community in the United States
 Gloria, Oriental Mindoro, a municipality in the Philippines

Sports 
 Gloria (basketball team), from Moldova
 Gloria (cycling team), an Italian professional cycling team that existed between 1927 and 1942
 Gloria Bistriţa, a Romanian soccer club
 Gloria Buzău (disambiguation), several Romanian sports clubs
 Grêmio Esportivo Glória, Brazilian soccer club

Ships 
 ARC Gloria, a training ship of the Colombian Navy
 RV Gloria Michelle, a U.S. National Oceanic and Atmospheric Administration research vessel in service since 1980
 SS Gloria (1917), a German cargo ship in service during 1939

Other uses 
 Nissan Gloria, a Japanese automobile
 Gloria (heating system), a type of central heating system formerly used in Castile
 Hurricane Gloria (1985)
 Gloria Cultural Arena, a culture and music venue in Helsinki, Finland
 Gloria-Theater (Cologne)
 Gloria (magazine), a Croatian women's magazine
 , a Finnish women's magazine
 Gloria Material Technology Corp., a steelmaking company in Taiwan
 Global Observation Research Initiative in Alpine Environments, an international mountain environment monitoring program
 Global Research in International Affairs Center, an institute of the Interdisciplinary Center in Israel
 GLORIA sidescan sonar, a sonar system
 Gloria, an Indonesian Christian tabloid

See also 
 Glória (disambiguation)
 Glory (disambiguation)